Newland is a single-member electoral district for the South Australian House of Assembly. It is named after pioneer Simpson Newland, a prominent figure in nineteenth-century South Australia. It is a 69.3 km² suburban electorate in north-eastern Adelaide, taking in the suburbs of Banksia Park, Fairview Park, Yatala Vale, Hope Valley, Ridgehaven, St Agnes, Tea Tree Gully, and Modbury, as well as part of Modbury North.

Replacing the abolished electoral district of Tea Tree Gully, Newland was created at the 1976 redistribution, taking effect at the 1977 election. It followed a bellwether pattern until the 1989 election, where it was won by Liberal candidate Dorothy Kotz. Kotz developed a strong personal following and had little difficulty being re-elected until her retirement at the 2006 election. Her retirement and the landslide Labor victory across the state led to Labor candidate Tom Kenyon winning the electorate. It became the Labor government's most marginal electorate at the 2014 election.

The 2016 redistribution ahead of the 2018 election changed Newland from a 1.4 percent Labor electorate to a notional 0.1 percent Liberal electorate.

Members for Newland

Election results

Notes

References
 ECSA profile for Newland: 2018
 ABC profile for Newland: 2022
 ABC profile for Newland: 2018
 Poll Bludger profile for Newland: 2018

Electoral districts of South Australia
1977 establishments in Australia